Tyler Nase (born August 30, 1990) is an American rower. He competed in the men's lightweight coxless four event at the 2016 Summer Olympics. He rowed at La Salle College High School and Princeton University.

References

External links
 

1990 births
Living people
American male rowers
Olympic rowers of the United States
Rowers at the 2016 Summer Olympics
Place of birth missing (living people)